There's One in Every Family is the second  studio album by the American  rapper Fiend, released in 1998 on No Limit Records. It was produced by Master P and Beats By the Pound. Like most of the albums released by No Limit in the late 1990s, the album was a success, peaking at #8 on the Billboard 200 and #1 on the Top R&B/Hip-Hop Albums. It featured all of the label's top acts, including Master P, Snoop Dogg, Silkk the Shocker, Mystikal, Mia X, and C-Murder.

Commercial performance
The album was certified Gold by the RIAA. The single, "Take My Pain", featuring Master P, Silkk The Shocker, and Sons of Funk, peaked at #11 on the Top Hip-Hop Singles & Tracks.

Track listing

Charts

Weekly charts

Year-end charts

Certifications

See also
List of number-one R&B albums of 1998 (U.S.)

References

1998 albums
Fiend (rapper) albums
No Limit Records albums
Priority Records albums